The 1910 SAFL Grand Final was an Australian rules football championship match. Port Adelaide beat  60 to 41 to claim the 1910 SAFL season premiership.

References 

SANFL Grand Finals
SAFL Grand Final, 1910